Salix caesia is a small shrub in the genus Salix, the willows. It is widespread, mainly in Asia.

Taxonomy
The name Salix caesia was first published in 1789 by Dominique Villars. Synonyms for Salix caesia are: Salix minutiflora , Salix divergens , and Salix myricaefolia .

Description
The bark of young twigs is reddish-brown or reddish-black and sometimes silky hairy; later the bark of the branches is bare, brown and shiny.

They are dark green on the upper surfaces and blueish green on the undersides. The leaf margin is nearly smooth. The stipules are usually small.

The flowering period begins in May. The bracts are light brown, weak, and hairy. The male flowers contain two stamens, partially fused, and the anthers are dark blue-violet. In female flowers, the ovary is almost sessile, hairy, the style relatively short and thick, the stigmas red and not divided, and they have a nectar gland.

The seeds are surrounded by fine hairs.

The number of chromosomes is 2n=76.

Distribution and habitat
The main distribution areas of Salix caesia are the Chinese autonomous regions of Xinjiang and Tibet; Central Asia: Afghanistan, Kyrgyzstan, Tajikistan, Mongolia; West and East Siberia, Pakistan and Kashmir. It is very rare in Europe, where it has been found in Italy, France, Switzerland, and Austria.

It grows in subalpine meadows and thickets. It is a characteristic species of German "Salicetum Caesio-foetidae" from the association "Salicion waldsteinianae".

References

Andreas Roloff, Andreas Bärtels: Flora of the woods. Purpose, properties and use. With a winter key from Bernd Schulz. 3rd, corrected edition. Eugen Ulmer, Stuttgart (Hohenheim) 2008, .
 
 
 Thomas Meyer: Datenblatt mit Bestimmungsschlüssel und Fotos bei Flora-de: Flora von Deutschland (alter Name der Webseite: Blumen in Schwaben).
 Michael Hassler, Bernd Schmitt: Datenblatt bei Flora von Deutschland – Eine Bilder-Datenbank, Version 2.92.

caesia
Flora of Asia
Flora of Europe